Drue Pearce (born April 2, 1951) is an American businesswoman and politician. She is currently Director, Government Affairs at Holland & Hart, LLP.

Early life and education 
Born in Fairfield, Illinois, Pearce received her bachelor's degree in biological science from Indiana University in 1973. She then received her master's degree in public administration from the John F. Kennedy School of Government in 1984. In 1989, Pearce completed the Executive Program at the University of Virginia Darden School of Business.

Career 
Pearce lived in Anchorage, Alaska and was in the banking and real estate business. From 1985 to 1989, Pearce served in the Alaska House of Representatives and was a Republican. Then, from 1989 to 2001, Pearce served in the Alaska State Senate and was president of the senate in 1995 and 1999. In 2001, Pearce resigned from the Alaska Senate to be the senior advisor of Alaska Affairs to the Secretary of the United States Department of Interior serving from 2001 to 2006. From 2006 to 2010, Pearce served as the administrator of the Office of the Federal Coordinator, Alaska Natural Gas Transportation Projects overseeing the construction of the proposed Alaska Natural Gas Pipeline.

References

External links

 Drue Pearce at 100 Years of Alaska's Legislature

1951 births
21st-century American women politicians
21st-century American politicians
Republican Party Alaska state senators
Businesspeople from Anchorage, Alaska
George W. Bush administration personnel
Indiana University alumni
Harvard Kennedy School alumni
Living people
Republican Party members of the Alaska House of Representatives
People from Wayne County, Illinois
Politicians from Anchorage, Alaska
University of Virginia Darden School of Business alumni
Women state legislators in Alaska
Trump administration personnel